Nicolás Franco (born 29 April 1996) is an Argentine professional footballer who plays as a centre-forward for San Martín SJ.

Career
Franco played for the River Plate youth academy, featuring for the U20 side at the 2016 U-20 Copa Libertadores. Franco started his senior career in 2016 with Argentine Primera División side River Plate, he was an unused substitute for a match with Vélez Sarsfield on 30 April. On 4 July 2016, Franco joined LigaPro side Freamunde on loan. He returned to River Plate six months later without featuring. In July 2017, Aldosivi loaned Franco. He made his professional debut on 4 September in a Copa Argentina home loss to Vélez Sarsfield, prior to making a first league appearance against Santamarina on 16 September.

Franco permanently departed River Plate in June 2018 to join Nueva Chicago of Primera B Nacional. He scored nine goals in his sole season with them, notably netting braces against Independiente Rivadavia; once in the regular season and once in the play-offs, which they lost. June 2019 saw Franco head abroad to Bolivian Primera División team Oriente Petrolero. Seven goals occurred during 2019, which included braces over Real Potosí and Bolívar. In March 2020, Franco headed to Uruguay with Peñarol. He made his debut against Montevideo City Torque on 12 September, though was subbed off early due to injury.

Franco returned to Argentina with Patronato in January 2021. After a year at Patronato, Franco signed with [[San Martín de San Juan in January 2022.

Career statistics
.

Honours
Aldosivi
Primera B Nacional: 2017–18

References

External links

1996 births
Living people
Sportspeople from Buenos Aires Province
Argentine footballers
Association football forwards
Argentine expatriate footballers
Expatriate footballers in Portugal
Expatriate footballers in Bolivia
Expatriate footballers in Uruguay
Argentine expatriate sportspeople in Portugal
Argentine expatriate sportspeople in Bolivia
Argentine expatriate sportspeople in Uruguay
Primera Nacional players
Bolivian Primera División players
Uruguayan Primera División players
Club Atlético River Plate footballers
S.C. Freamunde players
Aldosivi footballers
Nueva Chicago footballers
Oriente Petrolero players
Peñarol players
Club Atlético Patronato footballers
San Martín de San Juan footballers